The FJ engine was a series of straight-4 four-valve DOHC 2.0- or 2.4–litre internal combustion engines produced by Nissan in the 1980s. They were one of the first mass-produced Japanese engines with more than two valves per cylinder, as well as having electronic fuel injection.

The FJ series came in 2.4 L guise as a rally motor for the 240RS, and 2.0 L for general production models. A 1.5 L variant was designed and a prototype was built, however it never went into production. It has an aluminium head, chain driven cams, and an iron block. It featured large ports, dual valve-springs and a wide angle bucket on shim valvetrain design similar to other (later) Nissan twincams like the VG, CA, RB, and KA, series DOHC motors and the previous S20 6 cyl DOHC motor from the early 1970s GT-R. The FJ20 weighs  while the FJ24 weighs . Turbo motors were only available in Japan and New Zealand while the non-turbo variants were available in Japan, Hong-Kong, Australia and Europe. It was discontinued in the mid-1980s due to its prohibitive cost (mainly due to its cast-iron block).

It is acclaimed by some as the forefather of the CA engine. Although the DOHC CA head is similar, this is unlikely, as the SOHC CA head was devised as a lightweight replacement for the L/Z series motors when the FJ first entered production, and the DOHC CA head appeared later when the RB series was released. Datsun enthusiasts like to swap FJ engines into L or Z series powered vehicles. The FJ has similar mounting points to L/Z/KA blocks.

Specifications
NOTE: These engines were developed before Nissan used the "D" designation for dual overhead camshafts. The FJ is indeed a DOHC 16 valve design with mechanically actuated cam on bucket follower design. The head is aluminium and the block is iron.

The numerical value is gross mark (engine single purpose crankshaft output).
A part of numerical value is different by Skyline and Silvia/Gazelle.
There is a version of the FJ24 with

FJ20E

Distinguished by the "E" for "Electronic Fuel Injection".

The FJ20E was installed in the DR30 Skyline RS, as well as the US110 and S12 Gazelle/Silvia RS and GP models.

FJ20ET
"E" for electronic fuel injection.
"T"  denotes turbocharged engine. Boost pressure to achieve this power output was only . Later intercooled versions produced  with a slight boost increase and smaller turbocharger exhaust housing.

The FJ20ET was installed in the DR30 Skyline RS/RS-X/RS-X Turbo C and S12 Gazelle/Silvia RS-X; Turbo C versions of the DR30 were intercooled, as well as some S12 RS-X trim cars. The intake plenum chamber was shortened in the S12 compared with the DR30 because of the smaller engine bay and thus produced slightly less torque and power. However the DR30 intake plenum can be fitted to the S12 engine bay with very little clearance. The DR30 FJ20ET also featured a twin scroll exhaust manifold, the S12 received a smaller log style turbo manifold due to lack of firewall clearance.

FJ24

200 or more were produced as a homologation car engine of World Rally Championship at that time according to the Group B regulation. The FJ24 was installed in the Nissan 240RS based on the S110 model Silvia. Among 200 total production number, 50 were right-hand drive (RHD), and 150 were left-hand drive, and obtained the Group B recognition of the WRC. 30 were used for the domestic rally championship in the WRC and each country from among the original 200. The number of sales in Japan is uncertain because there was no detailed record, though a small number of people bought the original rally cars. Therefore, development was not done in consideration of domestic exhaust emissions regulations.

Three 240RSs came to Guatemala. Their code numbers were 33D, 16E and 77. They were raced in the Guatemalan and Central American Championships in 1985 and 1986.

See also
Nissan Skyline
List of Nissan engines

FJ
Straight-four engines
Gasoline engines by model